Carmelita is a feminine given name in Spanish, Filipino and English.

Notable people with this name include:

 Carmelita Abalos (born 1962), Filipino politician
 Carmelita Abdurahman, Filipino academic in the field of linguistics
 Carmelita Correa (born 1988), Mexican track and field athlete
 Carmelita Geraghty (1901 - 1966), American silent-film actress and painter
 Carmelita González (1928 – 2010), Mexican actress 
 Carmelita Hinton (1890 - 1983), American educator
 Carmelita Jeter (born 1979), retired American sprinter
 Carmelita Little Turtle, Apache/Tarahumara photographer
 Carmelita Maracci (1908 – 1987), American dancer and choreographer 
 Carmelita Pope (1924 – 2019), American actress
 Carmelita Torres, Mexican human rights activist
 Carmelita Vigil-Schimmenti (born 1936), retired officer of the United States Air Force

English feminine given names
Spanish feminine given names
Filipino feminine given names